Qeshlaq-e Galam Ali Hajj Hoseyn (also Romanized as Qeshlāq-e Galam ʿAlī Ḩājj Ḩoseyn) is a village in Qeshlaq-e Sharqi Rural District, Qeshlaq Dasht District, Bileh Savar County, Ardabil Province, Iran. At the 2006 census, its population was 47, in 10 families.

References 

Towns and villages in Bileh Savar County